The 1997 Mr. Olympia contest was an IFBB professional bodybuilding competition held on September 20, 1997, at the Terrace Theater in Long Beach, California.

Results
Total prize amount awarded was $285,000.

Notable events
Dorian Yates won his sixth consecutive Mr. Olympia title despite tearing his left triceps three weeks before the competition
Flex Wheeler withdrew from the competition after he was car-jacked by two thieves, whom he fought, and scared off, but not before he had taken on some bruises and damages to his arm 
This year the contest involved a two-day format, prejudging Friday night, and finals Saturday night, last time this happened was 1989
During the competition Kevin Levrone was placed 6th, Lee Priest 5th and Paul Dillett 4th, 2 hours after the competition the results were amended

References

External links 
 Mr. Olympia

 1997
1997 in American sports
1997 in bodybuilding